The 2014–15 Nashville Predators season was the 17th season for the National Hockey League (NHL) franchise that was established on June 25, 1997.

Off-season
The day after the end of the Predators' 2013–14 season, where the team missed the Stanley Cup playoffs for the second-straight year, it was announced that after 17 years at the helm of the Nashville Predators, Barry Trotz was relieved of his duties as head coach.

On May 6, 2014, it was announced that Peter Laviolette, former head coach of the Philadelphia Flyers, was hired to replace Trotz as the new head coach of the Predators. The team also hired Kevin McCarthy as an assistant coach.

On June 27, 2014, during the first round of the 2014 NHL Entry Draft, the Predators traded right winger Patric Hornqvist and restricted free agent Nick Spaling to the Pittsburgh Penguins in exchange for right winger James Neal.

Playoffs

The Nashville Predators entered the playoffs as the Central Division's second seed. They lost to the Chicago Blackhawks in six games in the first round.

Standings

Suspensions/fines

Schedule and results

Pre-season

Regular season

Playoffs

Player stats
Final Stats 
Skaters

Goaltenders

†Denotes player spent time with another team before joining the Predators. Stats reflect time with the Predators only.
‡Traded mid-season. Stats reflect time with the Predators only.
Bold/italics denotes franchise record

Notable achievements

Awards

Milestones

Transactions 

The Predators have been involved in the following transactions during the 2014–15 season.

Trades

Free agents acquired

Free agents lost

Claimed via waivers

Lost via waivers

Player signings

Draft picks

The 2014 NHL Entry Draft will be held on June 27–28, 2014 at the Wells Fargo Center in Philadelphia, Pennsylvania.

Draft notes

The San Jose Sharks' second-round pick went to the Nashville Predators as the result of a trade on June 28, 2014 that sent Detroit's second-round pick in 2014 (46th overall) to San Jose in exchange for a fourth-round pick in 2015 and this pick.
The Florida Panthers' third-round pick (previously acquired by San Jose) went to the Nashville Predators as the result of a trade on June 28, 2014 that sent a third and fourth-round pick (72nd and 102nd overall) both in 2014 to San Jose in exchange for this pick.
The Nashville Predators third-round pick went to the San Jose Sharks as the result of a trade on June 28, 2014 that sent Florida's third-round pick in 2014 (62nd overall) to Nashville in exchange for a fourth-round pick in 2014 (102nd overall) and this pick.
The Nashville Predators fourth-round pick went to the San Jose Sharks as the result of a trade on June 28, 2014 that sent Florida's third-round pick in 2014 (62nd overall) to Nashville in exchange for a third-round pick in 2014 (72nd overall) and this pick.
The St. Louis Blues' fourth-round pick went to the Nashville Predators as the result of a trade on June 30, 2013 that sent a fourth-round pick in 2013 to St. Louis in exchange for a seventh-round pick in 2013 and this pick.
The Nashville Predators' seventh-round pick went to the Washington Capitals as a result of a trade on April 19, 2014 that sent Jaynen Rissling to Nashville in exchange for this pick.

References

Nashville Predators seasons
Nashville
Nashville Predators season, 2014-15